The Tour de Picardie was a professional multi-stage cycle road race that was held between 1936 and 2016 in Picardy, France. In its last twelve editions, it was organised as a 2.1 event on the UCI Europe Tour.

The race was called Tour de l'Oise from its founding in 1936 until 1999, when it was renamed the Tour de Picardie et de l'Oise, and then the Tour de Picardie in 2000, which it remained until its demise. It is not to be confused with a different race, also called the Tour de Picardie (or Grand Prix du Courrier Picard), which was staged from 1946 to 1965.

Winners

References

External links

 
  Tour de Picardie/Tour de l'Oise results memoire-du-cyclisme.net
 Tour de Picardie (1953–1964) results by memoire-du-cyclisme.net

 
UCI Europe Tour races
Cycle races in France
Recurring sporting events established in 1936
1936 establishments in France
Recurring sporting events disestablished in 2016
2016 disestablishments in France